Morgan Mitchell (born 3 October 1994) is an Australian athlete who specialized in the 400 metres and now competes in the 800 metres.

Early life
Mitchell started athletics in 2000, inspired by the success of compatriot Cathy Freeman at the Sydney Olympics, but stopped at the age of 12 to concentrate on netball. She represented Australia on junior level before returning to athletics in 2012.

Mitchell's father is an African American former professional basketball player who moved from the United States to Australia, and her mother is Australian.

Career
Mitchell competed in the 4 × 400 metres relay event at the 2015 World Championships in Beijing without advancing to the final. She represented Australia in the Women's 400m and Women's 4 × 400 m Relay at the 2016 Summer Olympics. Her personal best in the 400 metres is 51.25 seconds set in Birmingham in 2016.

In 2019, Mitchell switched focus to the 800 metres, rapidly improving to her current personal best of 2:00.06.

As part of her switch in event, Elizabeth Mathews became her coach and Mitchell began running 60-70 km a week rather than the 15 km per week she had done for sprinting previously.

Mitchell competed in the 2020 Tokyo Olympic Games. She came sixth in her Women's 800m heat with a time of 2:05.44 and was therefore eliminated.

International competitions

References

External links

 

1994 births
Living people
Australian female sprinters
Australian people of African-American descent
World Athletics Championships athletes for Australia
Athletes (track and field) at the 2014 Commonwealth Games
Athletes (track and field) at the 2018 Commonwealth Games
Commonwealth Games competitors for Australia
Athletes from Melbourne
Athletes (track and field) at the 2016 Summer Olympics
Olympic athletes of Australia
Universiade bronze medalists for Australia
Universiade medalists in athletics (track and field)
Medalists at the 2019 Summer Universiade
Athletes (track and field) at the 2020 Summer Olympics
Olympic female sprinters
21st-century Australian women
20th-century Australian women
People from Carlton, Victoria
Sportswomen from Victoria (Australia)